Season three of Quantum Leap ran on NBC from September 28, 1990 to May 22, 1991. The series follows the exploits of Dr. Sam Beckett and his Project Quantum Leap (PQL), through which he involuntarily leaps through spacetime, temporarily taking over a host in order to correct historical mistakes.  Season three consists of 22 episodes.

The episode "The Leap Home (Part 2) - Vietnam" won the series its third of three consecutive Primetime Emmy Awards for Outstanding Cinematography, while the episode "The Leap Home (Part 1)" earned a Creative Arts Emmy Award for Outstanding Makeup for a Single-Camera Series.

Episodes

References 

Quantum Leap seasons
1990 American television seasons
1991 American television seasons